Islamabad United is a franchise cricket team that represents Islamabad, the capital city of Pakistan, in the Pakistan Super League. They were the defending champions, as they won the title in 2018 season becoming the most successful PSL team at that time. They were one of the six teams that had a competition in the 2019 season. The team was captained by Pakistani quick bowler Mohammad Sami and by Shadab Khan in three matches after Sami was out injured, they had a good season and finished 3rd, after winning six matches from their twelve matches in the PSL 2019. Cameron Delport and Faheem Ashraf were team's leading runs-scorer and leading wickets-taker respectively.

Islamabad United
 Players with international caps are listed in bold.
 Ages are given as of the date of the first match of the 2019 season, 14 February 2019

Season summary

In the opening match of the season, United defeated Lahore Qalandars after chasing down 171 runs in the 20th over, winning the match by 5 wickets. Then they went on to lose their next two games against Multan Sultans by 5 wickets and Quetta Gladiators by 7 wickets, respectively. In the next game against Peshawar Zalmi, Being sent to bat first, the defending champions were 49–3 at one stage before Ian Bell and Cameron Delport put on 56 runs which helped the side post a competitive total of 158 runs for 9 in 20 overs. In the chase of 158 runs, Zalmi were reeling at 65 runs for 5 wickets at one stage. Kieron Pollard and Darren Sammy steadied the side with their 55-runs partnership. Zalmi hopes of winnings were dashed after Pollard departed after scoring 51 runs. In the end, Islamabad managed to win by 12 runs after captain Mohammad Sami's hat-trick in the last over.

References

External links

2019 Pakistan Super League
United in 2019
2019